Tuen Mun Hospital is an at-grade MTR Light Rail stop located between Tuen Mun Hospital and Tuen Mun River in Tuen Mun District. It began service on 18 September 1988 and belongs to Zone 3. It serves Tuen Mun Hospital and nearby areas.

References

MTR Light Rail stops
Former Kowloon–Canton Railway stations
Tuen Mun District
Railway stations in Hong Kong opened in 1988